The Big River is a minor tributary of the Mississippi River in western Wisconsin in the United States. It flows for its entire  length in western Pierce County, rising in the town of River Falls and flowing south-southwestwardly into the town of Oak Grove.

See also
List of Wisconsin rivers

References

Rivers of Wisconsin
Tributaries of the Mississippi River
Rivers of Pierce County, Wisconsin